Autié is a French language surname. Notable people with the surname include:

 Jean-François Autié (1758–1794), hairdresser to Queen Marie Antoinette
 Léonard Autié ( 1751–1820), French hairdresser and opera impresario

French-language surnames